Kristina Laum (born November 23, 1976) is a Korean retired professional wrestling valet and manager in Extreme Championship Wrestling and World Championship Wrestling. She used the names Kimona Wanalaya in ECW and Leia Meow in WCW.

Professional wrestling career

Extreme Championship Wrestling (1996)
Laum was asked by her friend Raven to go into professional wrestling while she was working as a go-go dancer at a club. She made her debut in Extreme Championship Wrestling (ECW) on January 27, 1996 as Raven's new valet under the name Kimona Wanalaya (a play-on-words for "Come on, I wanna lay ya") and she managed Raven to win the ECW World Heavyweight Championship on the same night. According to the storyline, Raven used her to replace Beulah McGillicutty, his former girlfriend and valet, who had announced that she was pregnant with Tommy Dreamer's child on January 7 at ECW's House Party event.

Wanalaya left Raven at Massacre on Queens Boulevard on April 13 after he slapped her for remonstrating with him, causing her to vow revenge. On April 20, 1996 at Hostile City Showdown, Shane Douglas, with Kimona by his side, called out Dreamer to inform him that Beulah had been cheating on him. While Dreamer was wondering who the person could be, in which Douglas replied “it's not a he”, Kimona snatched the microphone from Douglas's hand and shouted "It's me!" Moments later, Beulah made her way to the ring and she and Kimona shared a racy kiss and fell to the mat together before Dreamer decided to date both women. The segment is widely believed to be the first lesbian angle in a major wrestling promotion. A career highlight came when she danced atop the ECW Arena, a moment that was used to sell VHS copies of Extreme Warfare Vol. 2 until the promotion died.

Jersey All Pro Wrestling
Laum later left ECW and worked for Jersey All Pro Wrestling (JAPW) for a while as Kimona. While in JAPW, she wrestled Missy Hyatt in a series of mixed tag team matches and a steel cage match.

World Championship Wrestling (1999–2001)

She was signed by World Championship Wrestling (WCW) in 1999, and she eventually debuted alongside Varsity Club (Kevin Sullivan, Mike Rotunda and Rick Steiner) as the cheerleader, Leia Meow.
	 
This angle soon ended and she became the manager for the Jung Dragons (Jamie-San, Yun Yang, and Kaz Hayashi), thus turning heel. She would interfere in matches with a flying bodypress off of the top rope onto their opponents. She also had a dominatrix gimmick and carried a riding crop. She used it to attack Pamela Paulshock after Paulshock had won the "Miss WCW" contest that Meow participated in on September 25, 2000. She was then attacked by Midajah and had a brief rivalry with her leading to a fight on the following Thunder during Mike Awesome's Lava Lamp Lounge segment. She also had a short feud with Tygress and threatened to cut her hair off. By the time WCW was sold to Vince McMahon, she had been fired from WCW along with the majority of the other on-air female talent due to roster cuts.

Independent circuit
She went to the X Wrestling Federation (XWF) where she was known as Kris, a member of the X-Girls, a dance team that included Gorgeous George and Chiquita Anderson of the Nitro Girls. When XWF folded, Kristina retired from wrestling.

On April 1, 2022 Kimona Wana-Laya made an appearance at ICW No Holds Barred 24 in Newark, New Jersey.

References

External links
Online World Wrestling Profile

1976 births
American female professional wrestlers
South Korean female professional wrestlers
LGBT characters in professional wrestling
Living people
Sportspeople from Seoul
People from Maple Shade Township, New Jersey
Professional wrestling dancers
Professional wrestling managers and valets
South Korean emigrants to the United States
21st-century American women